Francis Channing Barlow (October 19, 1834 – January 11, 1896) was a lawyer, politician, and Union General during the American Civil War.

Early life and career
Barlow was born in Brooklyn, New York, the son of a Unitarian minister, but was raised in his mother's home town of Brookline, Massachusetts. He studied law at Harvard University, graduated first in his class, and was practicing law on the staff of the New York Tribune newspaper when the Civil War broke out in 1861.

Civil War
In April 1861, Barlow enlisted as a private in the 12th Regiment, New York State Militia, leaving behind his new bride, Arabella Wharton Griffith Barlow, ten years his senior, after one day of marriage. He was commissioned a first lieutenant in his first month of service. His regiment had only a three-month term of enlistment and he mustered out with his men, but soon found a new regiment. By November he was a lieutenant colonel in the 61st New York Volunteer Infantry Regiment, and by the time of the Peninsula Campaign in the spring of 1862, he became its colonel.

Barlow saw his first action at the Battle of Seven Pines as part of the brigade commanded by Brig. Gen. Oliver O. Howard in the II Corps of the Army of the Potomac. At Glendale, in the Seven Days Battles, his regiment became separated from the rest of the brigade; and he exercised personal initiative by advancing his men to the sound of the fighting, encountering a Confederate battle line and leading his men in a bayonet charge against it. The enemy fled, and Barlow picked up a fallen Confederate flag. At the Battle of Malvern Hill, Barlow and his men successfully defended the line against repeated Confederate assaults.

At the Battle of Antietam, commanding the 1st Brigade, 1st Division, II Corps, Barlow's men were in the center of fighting at the infamous sunken road ("Bloody Lane") and captured about 300 prisoners. He was wounded by an artillery shell in the face and by grapeshot in the groin. Brig. Gen. John C. Caldwell wrote about Barlow in his official report:

Two days after the battle, Barlow was promoted to brigadier general of volunteers. He was an unusual general, slight of build with a peaceful, boyish face, colorless cheeks without a typical general's beard, and a thin voice. He dressed informally, often wearing a "checked flannel lumberjack shirt" under an unbuttoned uniform coat. One of General George G. Meade's staff officers wrote that he looked "like a highly independent mounted newsboy." But Barlow had a reputation as an aggressive fighter with strong personal confidence. Rather than carrying the Army-issued officer sword, he wore a heavy enlisted man's cavalry saber, which he used to whack the backsides of stragglers. (His disdain for stragglers became a personal obsession. His columns on the march would be followed by a company in skirmish line with fixed bayonets to move them along.)

Barlow suffered from his Antietam wound for months, becoming emaciated and suffering from what doctors called an "influence of malaria." Although he was not fully recovered, he returned to the Army in April 1863 and commanded the 2nd Brigade, 2nd Division, XI Corps, at the Battle of Chancellorsville. There, his corps was subjected to the devastating flank attack of Lt. Gen. Thomas J. "Stonewall" Jackson that routed it, but Barlow's brigade had been detached to support the III Corps and thus escaped the humiliation. After the battle, General Howard promoted Barlow to command of the 1st Division, XI Corps, replacing its wounded commander, with orders to restore the fighting qualities of its defeated brigades. Barlow immediately angered his men by arresting the popular Col. Leopold von Gilsa, and they considered him a "petty tyrant."

On July 1, 1863, Barlow commanded his unhappy division at the Battle of Gettysburg. While awaiting the expected Confederate assault, Barlow left his assigned position to move to higher ground on Blocher's Knoll (now known as Barlow's Knoll). His move left the remaining XI Corps division, that of Maj. Gen. Carl Schurz, at risk, and exposed both of his own flanks. The Confederates took advantage of his error: Maj. Gen. Jubal Early's division overwhelmed Barlow's division and forced the retreat of the entire XI Corps with great loss. Barlow himself was wounded and left for dead on the field. He was found and cared for by Confederate Brig. Gen. John B. Gordon, who sent him to a field hospital. According to an account written by Gordon in 1901, he allowed Barlow's wife Arabella to enter the Confederate camp to tend to her wounded husband, but this account is deemed apocryphal. The popular story continued that Gordon presumed Barlow had died and that both men met years later, being very surprised each was still alive. An examination of Barlow's subsequent war record makes this story very unlikely.

As the Confederates retreated from Gettysburg on July 4, Barlow was left behind and recovered by Federal forces. He was hospitalized for a lengthy period and could not return to the Army until April 1864, just in time for Lt. Gen. Ulysses S. Grant's Overland Campaign. He commanded the 1st Division of Maj. Gen. Winfield S. Hancock's II Corps, at the Battle of the Wilderness. At Spotsylvania Court House, his division incorporated shock tactics developed by Col. Emory Upton to quickly assault the rebel entrenchments in the "Mule Shoe", effecting a breakthrough that could be exploited by reinforcements. Hand-to-hand fighting ensued for 21 hours, the longest hand-to-hand combat in the entire war, before Barlow's division finally broke through. On December 12, 1864, President Abraham Lincoln nominated Barlow for the award of the brevet grade of major general, to rank from August 1, 1864, for his leadership at the Battle of Spotsylvania, and the U.S. Senate confirmed the award on February 14, 1865. He fought at the Battle of Cold Harbor and the Siege of Petersburg in the same command.

At Petersburg, Barlow took another convalescent leave in July, but returned to the army on April 6, 1865. He was appointed to lead the 2nd Division, II Corps after Gen. William Hays failed to wake his troops in time for departure. Barlow thus joined the Appomattox Campaign and engaged immediately in the Battle of Sailor's Creek.

The next day, Barlow played a decisive role in the Battle of High Bridge near Farmville, Virginia. Barlow was pursuing Confederate troops who had crossed High Bridge the previous day. The Confederate troops included men led by Gen. Gordon, who at the time believed that he had killed Barlow at the Battle of Gettysburg. The Battle of High Bridge included two skirmishes, the first of which took place in the evening of April 6, prior to Barlow's arrival. Confederate forces captured roughly 800 men and wounded or killed others. They then planned to destroy the bridge afterward in order to prevent its use by Union forces. However, a delay in sending an order to destroy the bridge proved to be advantageous for Barlow's men, who arrived in the early morning of April 7 to find the lower level of the bridge in flames and collapsing. Barlow commanded some of his men to charge the bridge and put out the fire, and the second skirmish of the battle ensued. Union forces successfully crossed the upper level of the bridge and fought with the Confederates. The Confederate forces eventually retreated towards Appomattox Station, away from Farmville, where they hoped to find food and supplies. These actions by Barlow and his men potentially shortened the war by several days and put additional pressure on Gen. Robert E. Lee to surrender.

Barlow was appointed major general of volunteers on May 26, 1865, to rank from May 25, 1865, but the promotion was not confirmed by the U.S. Senate until February 23, 1866, after the war was over and Barlow had resigned from the army.

Barlow was one of only a few men who entered the Civil War as an enlisted man and ended as a general.

Postbellum life
Arabella Barlow served as an army nurse in the Peninsula, Antietam, and Gettysburg campaigns. Twice she cared for her wounded husband. She died of typhus on July 27, 1864, while Francis was battling in the Overland Campaign. George Templeton Strong described her as "certainly the most brilliant, cultivated, easy graceful, effective talker of womankind, and [she] has read, thought and observed much and well."

After the war, he married Ellen Shaw, sister of Col. Robert Gould Shaw.

Leaving the army on November 16, 1865, Barlow served as a United States Marshal and the New York Secretary of State and New York State Attorney General, prosecuting the Boss Tweed ring, before he returned to his law practice. As U.S. Marshal for the Southern District of New York, during May–July 1869 Barlow prosecuted Cuban independence rebels for violating the Neutrality Act and disbanded the filibuster expeditions on the Perit, Quaker City, and Whiting steamers. He was a founder of the American Bar Association. He was active in Republican politics and investigated the 1876 presidential election, the Hayes-Tilden election, for irregularities.

Barlow died of Bright's disease in New York City on January 11, 1896. He was buried in Walnut Street Cemetery   in Brookline, Massachusetts.

In memoriam
Barlow is featured in Winslow Homer's painting Prisoners from the Front, depicting a scene from a June 21, 1864, engagement at Petersburg, Virginia.

See also

 List of American Civil War generals (Union)
 New York state election, 1865

Notes

References
 Eicher, John H., and David J. Eicher. Civil War High Commands. Stanford, CA: Stanford University Press, 2001. .
 Tagg, Larry. The Generals of Gettysburg. Campbell, CA: Savas Publishing, 1998. .
 Warner, Ezra J. Generals in Blue: Lives of the Union Commanders. Baton Rouge: Louisiana State University Press, 1964. .
 Barlow genealogy article

External links

 Civil War nurse site entry on Arabella Barlow
 
 Article on the Gordon/Barlow story in Historynet.com
 The Boy General, Francis Barlow, June 2022 Gettysburg College lecture by Joan Waugh, on C-SPAN

1834 births
1896 deaths
19th-century American politicians
Burials at Old Burying Ground (Brookline, Massachusetts)
Deaths from nephritis
Harvard Law School alumni
Lawyers from Brooklyn
New York State Attorneys General
New York (state) Republicans
Politicians from Brookline, Massachusetts
People of New York (state) in the American Civil War
Politicians from Brooklyn
Secretaries of State of New York (state)
Union Army generals
United States Marshals
19th-century American lawyers
Military personnel from Massachusetts